Pietro Badoglio, 1st Duke of Addis Abeba, 1st Marquess of Sabotino (28 September 1871 – 1 November 1956), was an Italian general during both World Wars and the first viceroy of Italian East Africa. With the fall of the Fascist regime in Italy, he became Prime Minister of Italy.

Early life and career 

Badoglio was born in 1871. His father, Mario Badoglio, was a modest landowner, and his mother, Antonietta Pittarelli, was of middle-class background. On 5 October 1888 he was admitted to the Royal Military Academy in Turin. He received the rank of second lieutenant in 1890. In 1892, he finished his studies and was promoted to first lieutenant.

After completing his studies, he served with the Regio Esercito (Italian Royal Army) from 1892, at first as a lieutenant (tenente) in artillery. Badoglio was involved in the First Italo-Ethiopian War and the Italo-Turkish War.

First World War 
At the beginning of Italian participation in the First World War, he was a Lieutenant Colonel (Tenente Colonnello); he rose to the rank of Major General following his handling of the capture of Monte Sabotino in May 1916 and by the late months of 1917, by now already a Lieutenant General,  was named as Vice Chief-of-Staff (Sottocapo di Stato Maggiore) despite being one of those mainly responsible for the disaster during the Battle of Caporetto on 24 October 1917. 

With regard to the Battle of Caporetto, although he was blamed in various quarters for his disposition of the forces under his command before the battle, a commission of inquiry rejected most of the criticisms made upon him. In the years after the First World War, in which he held several high posts in the Regio Esercito, Badoglio exerted a constant effort in modifying official documents in order to hide his role in the defeat.

Italian Pacification of Libya 

Post-war, Badoglio was named as a Senator, but also remained in the army with special assignments to Romania and the U.S. in 1920 and 1921. At first, he opposed Benito Mussolini and after 1922 was side-lined as ambassador to Brazil. A political change of heart soon returned him to Italy and a senior role in the army as Chief of Staff from 4 May 1925.  On 25 June 1926, Badoglio was promoted to the rank of Marshal of Italy (Maresciallo d'Italia).

Badoglio was the first unique governor of Tripolitania and Cyrenaica (later amalgamated as Italian Libya) from 1929 to 1933. During his governorship, he played a vital part (with Rodolfo Graziani, deputy governor of Cyrenaica) in defeating the Libyan Resistance by waging a near-genocidal campaign. On 20 June 1930, Badoglio wrote to General Graziani: "As for overall strategy, it is necessary to create a significant and clear separation between the controlled population and the rebel formations. I do not hide the significance and seriousness of this measure, which might be the ruin of the subdued population ... But now the course has been set, and we must carry it out to the end, even if the entire population of Cyrenaica must perish". By 1931, well over half of the population of Cyrenaica were confined to 15 concentration camps where many died as a result of overcrowding together with a lack of water, food and medicine while Badoglio had the Air Force use chemical warfare against the Bedouin rebels in the desert. On 24 January 1932 (third anniversary of his appointment), Badoglio proclaimed the end of Libyan resistance for the first time since the Italian invasion in 1911.

Italian invasion of Ethiopia 

On 3 October 1935, because the progress of De Bono's invasion of Abyssinia was judged to be too slow by Mussolini, Badoglio, who had in the meantime launched an epistolary campaign against Emilio de Bono, replaced de Bono as the commander. Badoglio asked for and was given permission to use chemical warfare, using as a pretext the torture and murder of downed Italian pilot Tito Minniti during the Ethiopian "Christmas Offensive". The British historian Sir Ian Kershaw wrote the "barbarous initiatives in the conduct of the war in Ethiopia" came as a rule from the military elite rather than from Mussolini himself.

He employed mustard gas to effectively destroy the Ethiopian armies confronting him on the northern front. Badoglio commanded the Italian invasion army at the First Battle of Tembien, the Battle of Amba Aradam, the Second Battle of Tembien, and the Battle of Shire. On 31 March 1936, Badoglio defeated Emperor Haile Selassie commanding the last Ethiopian army on the northern front at the Battle of Maychew. On 26 April, with no Ethiopian resistance left between his forces and Addis Ababa, Badoglio launched his "March of the Iron Will" to take the Ethiopian capital city and end the war. By 2 May, Haile Selassie had fled the country.

On 5 May 1936, Marshal Badoglio led the victorious Italian troops into Addis Ababa. Mussolini declared King Victor Emmanuel to be the Emperor of Ethiopia, and Ethiopia became part of the Italian Empire. On this occasion, Badoglio was appointed the first Viceroy and Governor General of Ethiopia and ennobled with the victory title of Duke of Addis Abeba ad personam.

On 11 June 1936, Rodolfo Graziani replaced Badoglio as Viceroy and Governor-General of Ethiopia.  Badoglio returned to his duties as the Supreme Chief of the Italian General Staff.  According to Time magazine, Badoglio even joined the Fascist Party in early June.

World War II 

Badoglio was Chief of Staff from 1925 to 1940, and it was he who had the final say on the entire structure of the Armed Forces, including doctrine, selection of officers, armaments, during that period, influencing the whole military environment. Badoglio was not in favour of the Italian-German Pact of Steel and was pessimistic about the chances of Italian success in any European war.  Despite such misgivings, he did not oppose the decision of Mussolini and the King to declare war on France and Great Britain. Following the Italian army's poor performance in the invasion of Greece in December 1940, he resigned from the General Staff. Badoglio was replaced by Ugo Cavallero.

By early 1943, there was a wide held belief by the military elite that Italy needed to sign an armistice in order to exit the war. Mussolini needed to go, as he was neither willing to sign an armistice nor were the Allies willing to sign an armistice with him. The two men considered to replace Mussolini were Marshal  Badoglio and Marshal Enrico Caviglia. As Marshal Caviglia was one of the few Royal Army officers who was known to dislike Fascism,  the king was unwilling to have him as prime minister. Victor Emmanuel wanted an officer who was committed to continuing the Fascist system, which led him to choose Badoglio who had faithfully served Mussolini and committed an array of atrocities in Ethiopia, but who had a grudge against Il Duce for making him the scapegoat for the failed invasion of Greece in 1940. Moreover, Badoglio was an opportunist well known for his sycophancy towards those in power, which led the king to choose him as Mussolini's successor as he knew that Badoglio would do anything to have power whereas Caviglia had a reputation as a man of principle and honor. On 15 July 1943, in a secret meeting Victor Emmanuel told Badoglio that he would soon be sworn in as Italy's new prime minister and the king wanted no "ghosts" (i.e. liberal politicians from the pre-fascist era) in his cabinet.

On 24 July 1943, as Italy had suffered several setbacks following the Allied invasion of Sicily in World War II, Mussolini summoned the Fascist Grand Council, which voted no confidence in Mussolini. The following day Il Duce was removed from government by King Victor Emmanuel III and arrested. On 3 September 1943, General Giuseppe Castellano signed the Italian armistice with the Allies in Cassibile on behalf of Badoglio, who was named Prime Minister of Italy. Wary of the potentially hostile German response to the Armistice, Badoglio hesitated to formally announce the treaty.

On 8 September 1943, the armistice document was published by the Allies in the Badoglio Proclamation, before Badoglio could communicate news of the switch to the Italian armed forces. The units of the Italian Royal Army, Royal Navy, and Royal Air Force were generally surprised by the switch and unprepared for German actions to disarm them. In the early hours of the following day, 9 September 1943, Badoglio, King Victor Emmanuel, some military ministers, and the Chief of the General Staff escaped to Pescara and Brindisi seeking Allied protection.

On 23 September 1943, the longer version of the armistice was signed in Malta. On 13 October, Badoglio and the Kingdom of Italy officially declared war on Nazi Germany. Badoglio continued to head the government for another nine months.

On 9 June 1944, following the German rescue of Mussolini, the capture of Rome by the allies, and increasingly strong opposition to his government, Badoglio was replaced by Ivanoe Bonomi of the Labour Democratic Party.

Final years 
Due to increased tensions with the Soviet Union, the British government saw Badoglio as a guarantor of an anti-communist post-war Italy. Consequently, Badoglio was never tried for Italian war crimes committed in Africa.

Badoglio died in Grazzano Badoglio on 1 November 1956.

See also 
 Royal Italian Army
 Royal Italian Army (1940–1946)
 Italian Co-Belligerent Army

Bibliography 
 Pietro Badoglio: Italy in the Second World War, memories and documents. (Transl.: Muriel Currey). Oxford University Press, 1948. Repr. 1976, Greenwood Press: 
 Pietro Badoglio: The war in Abyssinia. (Foreword: Benito Mussolini). London, Methuen Publishers, 1937.

References

Further reading 
Italian Defence Minister website official biography of Pietro Badoglio as Chief of the General Staff
Armellini, Quirino, and Pietro Badoglio. Con Badoglio in Etiopia, Etc. 1937. 
Bertoldi, Silvio. Badoglio. Milano: Rizzoli, 1982. 
De Luna, Giovanni. Badoglio: Un Militaire al Potere. Milan: Bompiani, 1974. For English translation, see .
Whittam, John. The Politics of the Italian Army, 1861–1918. London: Croom Helm, 1977.  
Del Boca, Angelo. La guerra d'Etiopia. L'ultima impresa del colonialismo. Milan: Longanesi, 2010. .

External links 

 

|-

|-

|-

|-

|-

|-

|-

|-

|-

|-

|-

1871 births
1956 deaths
Italian war crimes
Military history of Italy
Prime Ministers of Italy
Field marshals of Italy
Foreign ministers of Italy
World War II political leaders
Italian military personnel of World War I
Italian military personnel of World War II
People of former Italian colonies
History of Addis Ababa
Dukes of Italy
Members of the Senate of the Kingdom of Italy
Chiefs of Italian general staff
20th-century Italian politicians
Recipients of the Order of Saints Maurice and Lazarus
Italian generals
History of Salerno
People from Grazzano Badoglio
Italian anti-communists
Italian fascists
Ambassadors of Italy to Brazil
Italian military personnel of the Italo-Turkish War
Italian military personnel of the Second Italo-Ethiopian War
Knights of the Holy Sepulchre